Traidenis (died 1282) was the Grand Duke of Lithuania from 1270 (or 1269) until 1282. He is the second most prominent, after Mindaugas, Grand Duke of Lithuania in the 13th century. His reign ended a seven-year unrest period after Mindaugas was assassinated in 1263 and firmly established the Grand Duchy as a pagan state for another hundred years.

Traidenis expanded the Grand Duchy into the territories of Sudovians and Semigalians and strengthened its presence in Black Ruthenia. Unlike Mindaugas, Traidenis did not concentrate on expansion into the east.
 
The circumstances surrounding Traidenis' advance to power are not clear. While his ancestors are unknown, it is known that he came from Aukštaitija, as he was Duke of Kernavė. From the outset his relationships with Halych-Volhynia were tense as he replaced Shvarn, Duke of Halych-Volhynia and Lithuania. The tension eventually resulted in the 1274–1276 war. Despite Mongol support to Halych-Volhynia, Traidenis was successful in battle and his control over Black Ruthenia (Navahradak, Hrodna, Slonim, and other cities) was strengthened. Traidenis also made incursions into Poland, especially surroundings of Lublin and Łęczyca, that continued to about 1306. However, these raids did not affect Masovia as Traidenis established a dynastic link through his daughter Gaudemunda with its dukes. This dynastic relationship was further developed by Gediminas.

Traidenis, known for his devotion to paganism and anti-German attitude, was also successful in fighting with the Livonian Order. In 1270 he won the Battle of Karuse, fought on ice near Saaremaa, and killed Otto von Lutterberg, master of the Order. A new master, Andreas von Westfalen, sought a quick revenge, but was also killed by Traidenis. However, by 1272 the Order retaliated, attacking Semigalia and building Dinaburg Castle in 1273 on lands nominally controlled by Traidenis. Despite four siege engines used to throw stones, he was unable to capture the new fortress and had to retreat in 1278. In 1279 the order attacked Lithuanian lands, reaching as far as Kernavė, but on their way back they suffered a great defeat in the Battle of Aizkraukle. The Order's master, Ernst von Rassburg, became the third master to be killed by Traidenis. The defeat encouraged conquered Semigallians to rebel. The Semigalians, led by Nameisis, were now willing to acknowledge Lithuania's superiority and asked Traidenis for assistance. In 1281, Traidenis conquered Jersika Castle in the present-day Preiļi District, and was able to exchange it for Dinaburg Castle. However, Traidenis died soon afterwards, and assistance to Semigalians, exhausted by constant warfare, diminished. Traidenis is the first known Lithuanian duke to have died a natural death. All others before him were assassinated or killed in battle.

Family
Brothers
 Bardis, Liesis, and Svalkenis were Eastern Orthodox and died in fights with Halych-Volhynia
 Sirputis assisted his brother in military campaigns
Daughter
 Gaudemunda, married Bolesław II, Duke of Masovia, becoming Duchess of Masovia

References

Further reading
 
 

1220 births
1282 deaths

Grand Dukes of Lithuania